Lisa Demuth (born February 10, 1967) is an American politician serving in the Minnesota House of Representatives since 2019. A member of the Republican Party of Minnesota, Demuth represents District 13A in central Minnesota, which includes the cities of St. Joseph and Cold Spring, and parts of Stearns County. She has served as leader of the House Republican caucus and minority leader of the House of Representatives since 2023.

Early life, education, and career
Demuth was born in Paynesville, Minnesota. She graduated from Bloomington Kennedy High School.

Demuth co-owns and manages commercial property with her husband, Nick. She was elected to the Rocori school board as a write-in candidate in 2007 and reelected twice.

Minnesota House of Representatives
Demuth was first elected to the Minnesota House of Representatives in 2018. Demuth was recruited to run by the former representative for 13A, Jeff Howe, who was stepping down to run for the Minnesota Senate. During the 2020-2021 legislative session, Demuth served as an assistant minority leader in the House. Demuth is pro-life and supported fetal heartbeat legislation in the Minnesota House.

After the 2022 Minnesota House of Representatives Election saw Republicans fail to flip the House from Democratic control, Demuth was voted to serve as Minority Leader by her caucus. Demuth has portrayed herself as more collaborative and calm then her predecessor, Kurt Daudt. According to the American Conservative Union's scorecard, Demuth was ranked as less conservative than the average Republican legislator.

Demuth, who is biracial, is the first African American and the first biracial person to serve as Minority Leader of the Minnesota House of Representatives and the House Republican caucus. According to Demuth, she asked fellow legislators to pick her based on her qualifications, not her race.

Electoral History

Personal life
Demuth and her husband, Nick, reside in Cold Spring, Minnesota. They have four children.

References

External links

 Official House of Representatives website
 Official campaign website

1967 births
21st-century American politicians
21st-century American women politicians
African-American state legislators in Minnesota
Living people
Republican Party members of the Minnesota House of Representatives
Women state legislators in Minnesota